This was the first edition of the tournament.

Tímea Babos and Kateryna Volodko won the title, defeating Carolina Alves and Valeriya Strakhova in the final, 3–6, 7–5, [10–7].

Seeds

Draw

Draw

References

External Links
Main Draw

Barranquilla Open - Doubles